Domenico Siniscalco alias Domenico Giovanni Siniscalco(born 15 July 1954) is an Italian economist and former Minister of Finance.

Sinicalco graduated with law degree from the University of Turin. He served Italian government from June 2001 to July 2004 as Director General of Treasury. He took office as the Italian Minister of Economy and Finance on 16 July 2004 until 22 September 2005.

Along with Tommaso Padoa Schioppa he is not part of any significant political party preferring to remain independent. Siniscalco is Vice Chairman of Morgan Stanley Europe and Head of Italy's division at the same investment bank.

Notes

References

Living people
Politicians from Turin
1954 births
Italian economists
University of Turin alumni
Finance ministers of Italy